Miori (written: 美織) is a feminine Japanese given name. Notable people with the name include:

, Japanese idol and singer
, Japanese actress and singer

Japanese feminine given names